"Superhero" is the second American single released from the American version of British singer-songwriter Gary Barlow's debut solo album, Open Road. It was released on February 17, 1998, six weeks after the release of the album in America. The track also appears as a single on Barlow’s 2018 compilation album Open Road 21st Anniversary Edition.

Background
Whilst reworking Open Road for the American market, Barlow met with songwriters Kristian Lundin, Max Martin and Jolyon Skinner, and whilst recording alternate vocals for So Help Me Girl, wrote an entirely brand-new track, Superhero, exclusively for the American market. Barlow described the song as "Something designed to be suited to the kind of pop music in the American charts now, such as that of *NSYNC or the Backstreet Boys." The song was not as successful as his first American single, only peaking at #23 on the Billboard Adult Contemporary Chart, and not even charting on the Billboard Hot 100.

Reworking
During recording sessions for his second British album, Twelve Months, Eleven Days, Barlow decided that he would re-work the song and release in the United Kingdom. He made three minor changes, which included changing two lines in the chorus, enhancing the beat from 68bpm to 72bpm, and renaming the song For All That You Want. It was subsequently included as the first track on Twelve Months, Eleven Days, and was released as the second British single from the album, becoming the last single Barlow released in the United Kingdom until the Robbie Williams-duet Shame in 2010.

Music video
The music video for Superhero begins with Barlow witnessing a car crash. He manages to avoid getting hurt himself, but soon discovers that the driver of one of the vehicles involved has been seriously injured. He manages to pull her free, and as a thank you, she reaches up and kisses Barlow on the cheek. He then leaves the scene. Months later, Barlow witnesses a house fire, and while trying to save the occupants of the house, he discovers that the female is the same woman he helped in the car crash. She once again rewards him with a kiss on the cheek. The video concludes with the woman visiting Barlow at his house and thanking him for all he has done.

Track listing
 "Superhero" - 3:41
 "Lay Down For Love" - 5:35

Charts

References

British songs
1998 singles
Gary Barlow songs
Songs written by Gary Barlow
Songs written by Max Martin
Songs written by Kristian Lundin
Song recordings produced by Max Martin
Pop ballads
Songs written by Jolyon Skinner